Banovina or Banija is a geographical region in central Croatia, between the Sava, Una, Kupa and Glina rivers. The main towns in the region include Petrinja, Glina, Kostajnica, and Dvor. There is no clear geographical border of the region towards the west and the neighboring region of Kordun. The area of Banovina is today administratively almost entirely located within the Sisak-Moslavina County.

Name

The region's principal names come from the word "ban", with other names in use having included Banska Zemlja ("Ban's Land") and Banska Krajina ("Ban's Frontier"), which is a reference to the medieval Ban of Croatia and the Military Frontier, specifically Croatian Military Frontier.

The word  is Croatian for "banate".

The term Banovina was more frequent as the name of the region in the 19th and early 20th centuries. The term Banija became more common in the second half of the 20th century, until the 1990s. Since then, both terms are equally in use.

History

Prehistory
During the era of Chalcolithic Vučedol culture centered in Syrmia and eastern Slavonia spread to the area of modern day Banovina with known archaeological sites being those in Osječenica near the village of Gorička, Budim near the village of Mali Gradac and the Iron Age site next to the Una river in the village of Unčani. During the Iron Age region was inhabited by a Celtic-Illyrians tribe of Segestani.

Classical antiquity
During the Roman time the region was important transitional area between the provinces of Pannonia and Illyricum with nearby Siscia already serving as a regional center. Until today archaeological excavation of Roman sites in the region remain limited.

Middle Ages and Ottoman Conquest
The area surrounding Petrinja and Hrastovica belonged to the Kaptol while the area west of the Glina River belonged to the Topusko Abbey. The Order of Cistercians received the abbey's possessions in 1205 from the Andrew II of Hungary.

Habsburg Monarchy and Austro-Hungarian Empire
After the reconquest of Banija the region became a part of Glina Regiment of Zagreb General Command within the Croatian Military Frontier between 1553 and 1881. In November 1630, Holy Roman EmperorFerdinand II proclaimed the so-called Statuta Valachorum ("Vlach Statute"), which regulated the status of so-called Vlach settlers (in Banovina mostly ancestors of modern-day Serbs of Croatia) with regard to their military obligations and rights to internal self-administration. Croatian Military Frontier existed until 15 July 1881, when it was abolished and incorporated into the Kingdom of Croatia-Slavonia.

Kingdom of Yugoslavia
During the interwar period Banovina was divided between Vrbas Banovina whose seat was in Banja Luka and Sava Banovina whose seat was in Zagreb. In 1939 Sava Banovina became a part of the autonomous Banovina of Croatia.

World War II

During the World War II in Yugoslavia, the region was one of the main targets of the genocide of Serbs in the Independent State of Croatia. One of the most infamous mass killings was the Glina massacres of 2,000–2,400 people. Consequentially, the region also became one of the strongholds of the Yugoslav Partisans, Europe's most effective anti-Axis resistance movement.

Croatian War of Independence

During the Croatian War of Independence in the 1990s the entire region of Banovina became a part of internationally unrecognized self-proclaimed Republic of Serbian Krajina and known for infamous mass killings of Croats. Croatian government retook control over the region in 1995 via Croatian forces Operation Storm leading to mass fleeing of nearly the entire Serb population of Banovina and resulting serious depopulation of the region. Subsequent return was only partial and slow.

After the war, a number of towns and municipalities in the region were designated Areas of Special State Concern.

21st century

The 2020 Petrinja earthquake was a catastrophe that significantly affected this region. On 29 December 2020, the region was struck by a magnitude 6.4 earthquake, which killed seven people, including a seven-year-old girl. Most of the buildings in both towns and villages were significantly damaged or completely destroyed. The destruction combined with the ongoing COVID-19 pandemic presented challenges for emergency workers to distribute aid and healthcare to the affected population. Aftershocks continued to jolt the area in the subsequent days and weeks, including a magnitude 4.1 over two weeks later.

See also
Geography of Croatia
Glina, Croatia
Petrinja
Hrvatska Kostajnica
Dvor, Croatia
Sunja, Sisak-Moslavina County
Donji Kukuruzari

References

Sources

External links
  (Essay about names derived from the title Ban)

Geography of Sisak-Moslavina County
Regions of Croatia
Historical regions in Croatia
Historical regions
Banovina